Beau Busch (born 16 March 1984) is an Australian former footballer and, since July 2020, the co-Chief Executive of Professional Footballers Australia (PFA), alongside Kate Gill.

Club career
Busch trialled with the Newcastle Jets during the 2008 pre-season. On 25 October 2008, Busch made his debut for Sydney FC against Melbourne Victory as a short-term injury replacement. Busch's stellar performances for the North Queensland Fury gave him cult status amongst Fury fans, with the forming of the Busch supporter group the Beau Bro's. The Beau Bro's signature chant is to the tune of the Kasabian track Vlad the Impailer with 'Beau Busch' replacing the lyrics 'get loose'. On 25 June 2011, Busch moved to Scottish club Arbroath. He retired from professional football in 2012.

Post-playing career 
Busch returned to Australia in 2013 to take up a position with Professional Footballers Australia as their Media & Communications Manager. He subsequently worked as Head of Player Relations before being named co-Chief Executive in 2020.

References

External links

 North Queensland Fury profile

1984 births
Living people
Australian soccer players
A-League Men players
Northern Fury FC players
Sydney FC players
Arbroath F.C. players
Sportspeople from Newcastle, New South Wales
Scottish Football League players
Association football defenders